Museu Municipal de São Filipe (Portuguese for "São Filipe Municipal Museum") is a museum located in the historic centre of São Filipe, on the island of Fogo, Cape Verde. It is located in a sobrado, a colonial town house. The museum was opened on December 13, 2008, by the town president Eugênio Miranda da Veiga.

See also
List of museums in Cape Verde
List of buildings and structures in Cape Verde

Notes

External links

Official website 

São Filipe, Cape Verde
Museums in Cape Verde
Museums established in 2008
2008 establishments in Cape Verde